Riessler or Rießler is a surname. Notable people with the surname include:
 Paul Rießler (1865–1935), German biblical scholar
  (born 1957), German composer
 Michael Rießler (born 1971), linguist

German-language surnames